The Tidewater Transportation District Commission was formed in January 1973. 

The formation began with the acquisition of the Virginia Transit Company, Norfolk Division (January 1973), the Community Motor Bus of Portsmouth (May 1975) and the Norfolk, Portsmouth and Elizabeth Tunnel operators in September 1977.

The formation of the Tidewater Regional Transit (TRT) became complete in September 1977.

In 1999, TRT merged with PENTRAN and became Hampton Roads Transit.

Transportation in Virginia
Transit agencies in Virginia